Doug Domokos (December 31, 1955 – November 26, 2000), nicknamed, "The Wheelie King," was an American stunt motorcyclist and former World Record holder for the World's Longest Wheelie.

Early life
Domokos was born in Niles, Michigan on December 31, 1955. He began riding motorcycles at the age of 15 and was hooked instantly. Doug would ride motorcycles in his free time, mostly by an abandoned railroad terminal grounds near his house. He soon became a talented motocross rider. Later, he began working as a mechanic at a local motorcycle shop, Red Bud Cycle. Sometimes after working on a motorcycle, he would take it for a quick "test drive" by doing wheelies on it. During the motocross events at Red Bud MX Domokos would ride his motorcycle and during intermissions perform a wheelie show of his own for the crowd. From an early age, Domokos loved having the crowds attention, especially when he was on one wheel.

Career 
In the 1970s, Doug Domokos began performing shows professionally at RedBud events, with the help of the owner, Gene Ritchie. Years later in 1978, Domokos caught the attention of Kawasaki's Bryon Farnsworth, who liked what he saw. Soon after, Doug was given a new Kawasaki bike and a new Toyota pickup truck to travel all around the U.S. doing shows. By the late 70's Domokos was performing at stadiums and tracks nationwide. He gained national attention and was even featured in some motorcycle magazines. His hobby of stunt riding motorcycles was turning into a career.

In 1981 Domokos left Kawasaki and signed with Honda to go even bigger. They worked together to engineer motorcycles that wheelie better specifically for him. By then he was traveling all over the world to wheelie for all kinds of people. With Honda he went to England, France, Netherlands, Italy, Mexico, and all over South America. He even performed in Japan for the Emperor. Three years later, Domokos attempted to break the world record for the longest wheelie on a motorcycle. He made it into the Guinness Book of World Records with his 145 mile long wheelie at Talladega Speedway. This record would stand for over 8 years. Doug Domokos had many other accomplishments such as the World's Tallest Wheelie by doing 5 circles on the roof of the Empire State Building. Also, he held the world records for wheelying with eight passengers on a three-wheeler and six passengers on an ATV.

Accomplishments 
Doug Domokos held many world records such as the World's Longest Wheelie, and the World's Tallest Wheelie. He was featured in countless magazines and videos, and even wrote his own book, "Wheelyin' with the King." From the 1980s to 1990's motorsport fans worldwide knew his name. Also, Doug Domokos later devoted a lot of his time to giving back to society. He performed many shows to help raise money for various charities and organizations.

On November 26, 2000, Domokos died at age 44 in an ultralight aircraft accident. The accident happened in Murrieta, California. Also involved was Doug's instructor, Keith Lamb. Doug Domokos and his fiancee had one son, Nikolas.

References

 

1955 births
2000 deaths
Victims of aviation accidents or incidents in 2000
People from Niles, Michigan
Motorcycle stunt performers
Victims of aviation accidents or incidents in the United States
Accidental deaths in California